Lhoba (Lho-pa, Luoba) may be any of the languages of the Lhoba people, such as:
Adi
Bokar
Idu Mishmi